Charles Harold Busby (born July 24, 1963) is an American politician, engineer, and businessman serving as a member of the Mississippi House of Representatives from the 111th district. He assumed office in 2012.

Early life and education 
Busby was born in Laurel, Mississippi, and raised in Pascagoula. He earned an Associate of Science degree in pre-engineering from Mississippi Gulf Coast Community College in 1987 and a Bachelor of Science in mechanical engineering from the University of South Alabama in 1991.

Personal life 
According to the Mississippi House of Representatives website, "Rep. Busby is a member of the Pascagoula Rotary Club, Jackson County Chamber of Commerce, Jackson County Economic Development FDN, American Society of Mechanical Engineers, American Council of Engineering Companies, and the NRA."

Career 
Busby began his career as a project engineer for Brown & Root. From 1994 to 1996, he was a design engineer for Chevron. From 1996 to 2001, he was a project engineer for the Herzog-Hart Corporation, a subsidiary of the CDI Corporation. Since 2001, he has been the president of Orion Engineering. He has also worked as the director of Sirius Technical Services, an engineering and technical staffing agency. He was elected to the Mississippi House of Representatives in 2012. Since 2016, Busby has served as chair of the House Transportation Committee. He also serves on the state committees of Appropriations, Education, Energy, Gaming, Insurance, Interstate Cooperation, Marine Resources, and Ports, Harbors, and Airports.

On August 10th, 2022, Busby announced he would run for Transportation Commissioner for the Southern District, a position currently held by outgoing Republican Tom King.

References 

Living people
1963 births
People from Laurel, Mississippi
People from Pascagoula, Mississippi
Mississippi Gulf Coast Community College alumni
University of South Alabama alumni
Engineers from Mississippi
Republican Party members of the Mississippi House of Representatives
Businesspeople from Mississippi